Rolf Gjermundsen (5 June 1921 - 12 December 1994) was a Norwegian politician for the Labour Party.

He served as a deputy representative to the Norwegian Parliament from Østfold during the terms 1969–1973 and 1973–1977.

References

1921 births
1994 deaths
Labour Party (Norway) politicians
Deputy members of the Storting